Jinta County is a county in the northwest of Gansu province, the People's Republic of China, bordering Inner Mongolia to the north and east. It is under the jurisdiction of the prefecture-level city of Jiuquan. Its postal code is 735300, and in 1999 its population was 137,816 people.

Administrative divisions
Jinta County is divided to 7 towns, 2 townships and 2 others.
Towns

Townships
 Gucheng Township()
 Yangjingziwan Township()

Others
 Gansu Yasheng Agriculture and Industry Group Co., Ltd.()
 Industrial Park Management Committee()

Climate

See also
 List of administrative divisions of Gansu

References

 Official website (Chinese)

Jinta County
Jiuquan